GOST (Russian: ГОСТ) refers to a set of international technical standards maintained by the Euro-Asian Council for Standardization, Metrology and Certification (EASC), a regional standards organization operating under the auspices of the Commonwealth of Independent States (CIS). 
GOST standards were originally developed by the government of the Soviet Union as part of its national standardization strategy. The word GOST is an acronym for gosudarstvennyy standart, which means state standard or governmental standard.

GOST Standards 
 GOST 2.109-73: Unified system for design documentation. Basic requirements for drawing
 GOST 2.123-93: Unified system for design documentation. Sets of design documents for printing plates under automated design
 GOST 7.67-94: System of standards on information librarianship and publishing. Codes of names of countries
 GOST 7.79-2000: Standard for transliteration from Cyrillic to Latin script for use on the internet, for speakers of languages that are normally written in Cyrillic script but who do not have access to a Cyrillic keyboard.
 GOST 2187-79: Diving weights. Specifications
 GOST 2817-45: Transparent sublayer photographic materials. Method of general sensitometric test
 GOST 3303-82: Rubber hot-water bottles
 GOST 4805-49: Rubber boots
 GOST 5284-84: Canned meat "stewed beef"
 GOST 5461-59 and 13393-76 Electronic electro-vacuum and semiconductor devices. Ion instruments. Designation system
 GOST 7396-69: Plug-in connectors, double-pole with cylindrical contacts
 GOST 9155-88: Rubber and rubbertextile sports footwear (moulded and injection moulded). Specifications
 GOST 10585-99: Oil fuel. Mazut
 GOST 10859-64: Computing machines. Alphanumeric codes for punched cards and punched tapes A 1964 character set for computers, includes non-ASCII/non-Unicode characters required when programming in the ALGOL programming language.
 GOST 11828-86: Rotating electrical machines. General test methods
 GOST 13052-64: Computing machines and data transfer equipment. 7-bit codes for information exchange
 GOST 13393-76: Electric vacuum devices. Identification code
 GOST 14771-76: Gas-shielded arc welding. Welded joints. Main types, design elements and dimensions 
 GOST 15150-69: Machines, instruments and other industrial products. Modifications for different climatic regions. Categories, operating, storage and transportation conditions as to environment climatic aspects influence
 GOST 16876-71: Rules of transliteration of the Cyrillic alphabet letters using the Latin alphabet letters
 GOST 18682-73: Integrated circuits. Classification and reference designation system
 GOST 19768-74: Computer machines and data processing systems. 8-bit codes for information exchange and processing
 GOST 20568-75: Rubber masks for submarine swimming
 GOST 22469-77: Swimming rubber flippers
 GOST 26765.52-87: Bus serial interface for system of electronic modules. General requirements
 GOST 27463-87: Information processing systems. 7-Bit coded character sets
 GOST 27974-88: Programming language ALGOL 68
 GOST 27975-88: Programming language ALGOL 68 extended
 GOST 28147-89: Block cipher – commonly referred to as just GOST in cryptography
 GOST 32569-2013: Steel pipe technology. Requirements for design and operation of explosive and chemically dangerous production
 GOST 32410-2013: Emergency crash-systems railway rolling stock for passenger transportations. Technical requirements and methods of control

GOST R Standards 
GOST R, or Russian certification system, is a subset of GOST standards that is valid only in the territory of the Russian Federation, in contrast to the GOST standards, used across all CIS countries, including Russia.
 GOST R 1.5-2012: Standardization in Russian Federation. National Standards. Rules of structure, drafting, presentation and indication
 GOST R 1.13-2001: State system for standardization of Russian Federation. Procedure of notifications preparation on projects of normative documents
 GOST R 8.932-2017: State system for ensuring the uniformity of measurements. Requirement to methodologies (to the methods) of measuring in area of uses of nuclear-power. Substantive provisions
 GOST R 21.1101-2013: System of design documents for construction. Main requirements for design and working documents
 GOST R 34.11-94: Information technology. Cryptographic data security. Hashing function
 GOST R 34.12-2015: Information technology. Cryptographic data security. Block ciphers
 GOST R 42.7.01-2021 Civil defense. Emergency disposal of the dead in wartime and peace time. General requirements
 GOST R 60.2.2.1-2016: Robots and robotic devices. Safety requirements for personal care robots
 GOST R 50696-2006: Domestic cooking appliances burning gas. General technical requirements and test methods
 GOST R 52070-2003: Bus serial interface of electronic modules system. General requirements
 GOST R 50860-96: Aircraft and helicopters. Antenna feeder devices of connection, navigation, landing and air traffic control. General specification, parameters, methods of measurements
 GOST R 51555-99: Toys. General safety requirements and methods of tests. Mechanical and physical properties
 GOST R 52888-2007: Social services of the population. Social services to children
 GOST R 52630-2012: Steel welded vessels and apparatus. General specifications
 GOST R 52936-2008: Free-flow diving suits. General technical requirements
 GOST R 53279-2009: Fire equipment. Fire connecting heads. General technical requirements. Methods of testing
 GOST R 53574-2009: Noise. Assessment of noise annoyance by means of social and socio-acoustic surveys
 GOST R 53685-2009: Electrification and electric supply of the railways. Terms and definitions
 GOST R 53865-2010: Gas distribution systems. Terms and definitions
 GOST R 53940-2010: Cash register machines. General requirements for product and its application procedure
 GOST R 53953-2010: Railway telecommunication. Terms and definitions
 GOST R 54382-2011: Oil and gas industry. Submarine pipeline systems. General requirements
 GOST R 54435-2011: Wind power plant constructions. Base safety requirements
 GOST R 54594-2011: Offshore platforms. Rules of Inhabitation. General requirements
 GOST R 55967-2014: Lifts. Special safety requirements for the installation new lifts in existing buildings
 GOST R 56066-2014: Safety of amusement rides. Methods of measuring the acceleration acting on the passenger rides
 GOST R 56436-2015: Gymnastic equipment. Rings. Functional requirements, safety requirements and test methods
 GOST R 56825-2021: Intellectual property. Management at the State Academy of Sciences
 GOST R 57725-2017: Activities of legislative (representative) bodies of the constituent entities of the Russian Federation elected officials assistants. General requirements
 GOST R 57841-2017: Mining equipment. Belt conveyor rollers. General specifications
 GOST R 58783-2019: Conducting research in the polar regions. Terms and Definitions
 GOST R 59201-2021: Roads of public roads. Major repair, repair and maintenance. Technical rules
 GOST R 59488-2021: Automobile roads for general use. Bridge structures. Calculation rules for reinforcing reinforced concrete beam spans
 GOST R 59769-2021: Medical products. Risk management. Guidance for planning the risk analysis and assessment process
 GOST R 70033-2022: Earth Remote Sensing from Space. Data of Earth Remote Sensing from Space. General requirements to freely distributable data
 GOST R 70177-2022: Internet resources and other information presented in electronic digital form. User agents. Principles of accessibility for people with disabilities and other persons with disabilities

References 

GOST

External links 
 
 Gostperevod.com - Official English translations of GOST standards and regulations Russian GOST standards in English translations | EN version
 Gostperevod.ru - Стандарты ГОСТы и ГОСТы Р на английском языке | Official English translations of GOST standards and regulations - Russian GOST standards | RU version
 Meganorms.com - Russian and CIS standards norms laws in English | Official website Russian GOST standards in English translations | EN version
 Meganorms.ru - ГОСТы, стандарты и законы РФ и стран СНГ на английском языке | Official website Russian version Russian GOST standards in English translations | RU version